GemOx or GEMOX is an acronym for one of the chemotherapy regimens used in the treatment of relapsed or primary refractory non-Hodgkin's lymphoma and Hodgkin's lymphoma.

When combined with Rituximab it is called R-GemOx, R-GEMOX or GemOx-R, GEMOX-R.

The [R]-GemOx regimen consists of:
 (R)ituximab  - anti-CD20 monoclonal antibody that has the ability to kill both normal and malignant B cells;
 (Gem)citabine - an antimetabolite;
 (Ox)aliplatin - a platinum-based alkylating antineoplastic agent.

Dosing regimen

References

Chemotherapy regimens used in lymphoma